Euseius kenyae is a species of mite in the family Phytoseiidae.

References

kenyae
Articles created by Qbugbot
Animals described in 1978